Ratkovac is a village in the municipality of Lajkovac, Serbia. According to the 2011 census, the village has a population of 314 inhabitants.

Population

References

Populated places in Kolubara District